Statistics of the  Cambodian League for the 1986 season.

Overview
National Defense Ministry won the championship.

References
RSSSF

C-League seasons
Cambodia
Cambodia
football